Ajab Shir County is in East Azerbaijan province, Iran. The capital of the county is the city of Ajab Shir. At the 2006 census, the county's population was 65,741 in 16,039 households. The following census in 2011 counted 66,746 people in 18,097 households. At the 2016 census, the county's population was 70,852 in 20,608 households.

Administrative divisions

The population history and structural changes of Ajab Shir County's administrative divisions over three consecutive censuses are shown in the following table. The latest census shows two districts, four rural districts, and two cities.

References

 

Counties of East Azerbaijan Province